"As Your Friend" is a song by Dutch DJ Afrojack, featuring vocals by American singer Chris Brown. The song was released as a single via iTunes on 13 February 2013. It was written by Afrojack, Chris Brown, Nadir Sakir, DJ Buddha, and Polow Da Don, and was produced by Afrojack with co-production by Leroy Styles, DJ Buddha and Polow da Don. "As Your Friend" is featured as a bonus track on the deluxe version of Afrojack's 2014 debut studio album Forget the World.

Music video
On March 22, 2013, Afrojack uploaded a lyric video onto VEVO, while the official music video was released on 29 March. Chris Brown does not appear in the video.

The video features a lot of special effects, and features Afrojack with an eagle and many women dancing around him. Since its release the video has gained over 32,600,000 views.

Track listing

Chart performance

Weekly charts

Year-end charts

Release history

See also
 List of number-one dance singles of 2013 (U.S.)

References

2013 singles
2013 songs
Afrojack songs
Chris Brown songs
Songs written by Afrojack
Songs written by Chris Brown
Song recordings produced by Polow da Don
Songs written by Polow da Don
Songs written by DJ Buddha
Song recordings produced by DJ Buddha